The Bishop of Chur (German: Bischof von Chur) is the ordinary of the Roman Catholic Diocese of Chur, Grisons, Switzerland (Latin: Dioecesis Curiensis).

History

A Bishop of Chur is first mentioned in 451/452 when Asinius attended the Synod of Milan, but probably existed a century earlier. According to local tradition, the first Bishop of Chur was Saint Lucius, who is said to have died a martyr at Chur about the year 176, and whose relics are preserved in the cathedral. In the 7th century the bishopric acquired several territories south to the Lake of Constance. The see was at first suffragan to the archbishop of Milan, but after the treaty of Verdun (843) it became suffragan to Mainz. In 958 Holy Roman Emperor Otto I gave the bishopric to his vassal Hartpert with numerous privileges including control over the Septimer Pass, at the time the main pass through the central Alps. These concessions strengthened the bishopric's temporal power and later it became a princedom within the Holy Roman Empire. 

At the time of the Hohenstaufen emperors in the 12th to early 13th centuries, some bishops of Chur were appointed by the emperor, which for a period led to existence of two bishops at the same time, the other being appointed by the pope. In the 14th century bishop Siegfried von Gelnhausen acquired the imperial diocese of Chur from the Barons Von Vaz and represented emperor Henry VII in Italy.

In 1803 the see became immediately subject to the Holy See. Until 1997, the Roman Catholic Archdiocese of Vaduz had been part of the diocese of Chur.

List of Bishops of Chur

References

External links
 Official website (in German)

 
Austrian Circle
Lists of Swiss people

de:Liste der Bischöfe von Chur
fr:Diocèse de Coire
it:Diocesi di Chur